Th Institute of Applied Mathematics could refer to:
 The Keldysh Institute of Applied Mathematics in Moscow
 The Institute of Informatics and Applied Mathematics in Tirana, Albania
 The Institute for Pure and Applied Mathematics (IPAM), an American mathematics institute
 The Instituto de Investigaciones en Matemáticas Aplicadas y Sistemas (IIMAS, “Applied Mathematics and Systems Research Institute”) in Mexico City
 The Institute of Applied Mathematics at Heidelberg University
 The Instituto Nacional de Matemática Pura e Aplicada (“National Institute for Pure and Applied Mathematics”) in Brazil